Falmouth Grammar School was a grammar school in Falmouth, Cornwall, United Kingdom, from 1824 to 1971.

History

The school was first established in 1824 or 1825, originally as the Classical and Mathematical School. The buildings date from 1868. The school was closed in 1971, and part of the building was used by Falmouth School. The building is listed and is used for Adult Education.<ref name="FP_2021_listing"/.

There is a painting from 1951 by Wallace Martin, Falmouth Grammar School Swimming Sports at Sunny Cove, near Swanpool, Falmouth.

Notable students and staff

Students
John Sydney Hicks, physician and surgeon
Roger Hosen, rugby union player and cricketer
Paul Martin, antiques dealer and television presenter
Trevor McCabe, former Archdeacon of Cornwall
Victor Roberts (ruby player) played as a wing forward for England rugby XV and Cornwall XV
Harold Tarraway, middle-distance runner, competed in the men's 800 metres at the 1948 Summer Olympics
Sam Toy, industrialist
Richard M. Trevethan, First World War flying ace

Staff
Norman Pounds, geographer and historian

References

External links
 Falmouth Grammar School at the National Archives

1824 establishments in England
1971 disestablishments in England
Buildings and structures in Falmouth, Cornwall
Defunct grammar schools in England
Defunct schools in Cornwall
Educational institutions established in 1887
Educational institutions disestablished in 1971